Heren is a railway station on the Taiwan Railways Administration North-link line located in Xiulin Township, Hualien County, Taiwan.

History
The station was opened on 8 February 1979.

Around the station 
 Qingshui Cliff

References 

1979 establishments in Taiwan
Railway stations in Hualien County
Railway stations opened in 1979
Railway stations served by Taiwan Railways Administration